The Jezreel Valley (from the , translit. ʿĒmeq Yīzrəʿēl), or Marj Ibn Amir, also known as the Valley of Megiddo, is a large fertile plain and inland valley in the Northern District of Israel. It is bordered to the north by the highlands of the Lower Galilee region, to the south by the Samarian highlands, to the west and northwest by the Mount Carmel range, and to the east by the Jordan Valley, with Mount Gilboa marking its southern extent. The largest settlement in the valley is the city of Afula, which lies near its center.

Etymology

The Jezreel Valley takes its name from the ancient city of Jezreel (known in Hebrew as Yizre'el; ; known in Arabic as Zir'ēn) which was located on a low hill overlooking the southern edge of the valley. The word Jezreel comes from the Hebrew, and means "God sows" or "El sows". The phrase "valley of Jezreel" was sometimes used to refer to the central part of the valley, around the city of Jezreel, while the southwestern portion was known as the "Valley of Megiddo", after the ancient city of Megiddo, which was located there. The area has been known as the Plain of Esdraelon (Esdraelon (Ἐσδρηλών) is the Koine Greek rendering of Jezreel). The Arabic name Marj ibn Amir means "Meadows of the son of Amir".

Geology
The valley once acted as the channel by which the Mediterranean Sea, at the north-western end of the valley, connected to the Sea of Galilee, the Jordan Valley and ultimately to the Dead Sea. About two million years ago, as the land between the Mediterranean Sea and the Jordan Rift Valley rose, this connection was lost, and the periodic floods from the Mediterranean Sea ceased. This resulted in the Dead Sea no longer having a connection to the ocean, and over time, due to greater evaporation than precipitation plus surface water inflow, it has become heavily saline. The Sea of Galilee, on the other hand, consists of fresh water.

Biblical and theological relevance

In the Hebrew Bible
According to the Hebrew Bible, the valley was the scene of several battles with the Israelites. A victory was led by Deborah and Barak against the Canaanites. Another was led by Gideon against the Midianites, the Amalekites, and "the children of the East". It was later the location at which the Israelites, led by King Saul, were defeated by the Philistines. According to textual scholars, the account of an ancient Philistine victory at Jezreel derives from the monarchial source, in contrast to the republican source, which places the Philistine victory against the Israelites at Mount Gilboa. Another defeat was of King Josiah by the Egyptians.

In Christian eschatology
In Christian eschatology, the part of the valley on which the Battle of Megiddo was fought is believed to be the destined site of the penultimate battle between good and evil (with a later, final battle taking place 1,000 years later around Jerusalem), the place being known as Armageddon, a toponym derived from the Hebrew Har Megiddo, 'Mount Megiddo'.

History
The valley formed an easier route through Israel than crossing the mountains on either side, and so saw a large amount of traffic, and was the site of many historic battles

Archaeological excavations have indicated near continuous settlement from the Ghassulian culture of the Chalcolithic Age (c. 4500–3300 BCE) to the Ayyubid periods of the 11–13th centuries CE.

Copper, Bronze and Iron Ages

Biblical cities in the Jezreel Valley include Jezreel, Megiddo, Beit She'an, Shimron and Afula.

There is a surviving detailed account of the earliest battle for the Jezreel Valley, the 15th-century BC Battle of Megiddo, to prove that it was fought in the valley. Due to the surrounding terrain, Egyptian chariots were only able to travel from Egypt as far as the Jezreel Valley and the valley north of Lake Huleh.

In the western part of the Jezreel Valley, 23 of the 26 Iron Age I sites (12th to 10th centuries BCE) yielded typical Philistine pottery. These sites include Tel Megiddo, Tel Yokneam, Tel Qiri, Afula, Tel Qashish, Be'er Tiveon, Hurvat Hazin, Tel Risim, Tel Re'ala, Hurvat Tzror, Tel Sham, Midrakh Oz and Tel Zariq. Scholars have attributed the presence of Philistine pottery in northern Israel to their role as mercenaries for the Egyptians during their military administration of the land in the 12th century BCE. This presence may also indicate further expansion of the Philistines to the valley during the 11th century BCE, or their trade with the Israelites. There are biblical references to Philistines in the valley during the times of the judges. The quantity of Philistine pottery within these sites are still quite small, which means that even if the Philistines did settle the valley they were a minority that blended within the Canaanite population during the 12th century BC. The Philistines seem to have been present in the southern valley during the 11th century, which may relate to the biblical account of their victory at the Battle of Gilboa.

Roman period
In the late Second Temple period, Josephus refers to both the Jezreel Valley and the Beit Netofa Valley as the "Great Plain".

Ottoman era
Laurence Oliphant, who visited the Akko Sanjak valley area in 1887, then a subprovince of the Beirut vilayet, wrote that the Valley of Esdraelon (Jezreel) was "a huge green lake of waving wheat, with its village-crowned mounds rising from it like islands; and it presents one of the most striking pictures of luxuriant fertility which it is possible to conceive." In the early 1900, the Ottomans constructed the Jezreel Valley railway which ran along the entire length of the valley.

In the 1870s, the Sursock family of Beirut (present-day Lebanon) purchased the land from the Ottoman government for approximately £20,000. Between 1912 and 1925 the Sursock family (then under the French Mandate of Syria) sold their 80,000 acres (320 km²) of land in the Vale of Jezreel to the American Zion Commonwealth for about nearly three-quarters of a million pounds. The land was purchased by the Jewish organization as part of an effort to resettle Jews who inhabited the land, as well as others who came from distant lands.

British Mandate
After the land was sold to the American Zion Commonwealth, some of the Arab farmers who lived in nearby villages and had been working for the absentee landowners were given financial compensation or were provided with land elsewhere. Despite the sale, some of the farmers refused to leave their land, as in Afula (El-Ful), however the new owners decided that it would be inappropriate for these farmers to remain as tenants on land intended for Jewish labor. This was a commonplace feeling among segments of the Jewish population, part of a socialist ideology of the Yishuv, which included their working the land rather than being absentee landowners. British police had to be used to expel some and the dispossessed made their way to the coast to search for new work with most ending up in shanty towns on the edges of Jaffa and Haifa.

Following the purchase of the land, the Jewish farmers created the first modern-day settlements, founded the modern day city of Afula and drained the swamps to enable further land development of areas that had been uninhabitable for centuries. The first moshav, Nahalal, was settled in this valley on 11 September 1921.

After the widespread Arab riots of 1929 in the then British Mandate of Palestine, the Hope Simpson Enquiry was appointed to seek causes and remedies for the instability. The Commission's findings in regard to "Government responsibility towards Arab cultivators", was that the Jewish authorities "have nothing with which to reproach themselves" in the purchase of the valley, noting the high prices paid and land occupants receiving compensation not legally bound. The responsibility of the Mandate Government for "soreness felt (among both effendi and fellahin) owing to the sale of large areas by the absentee Sursock family" and the displacement of Arab tenants; noted that, "the duty of the Administration of Palestine to ensure that the rights and position of the Arabs are not prejudiced by Jewish immigration. It is doubtful whether, in the matter of the Sursock lands, this Article of the Mandate received sufficient consideration."

State of Israel
The Jezreel Valley is a green fertile plain covered with fields of wheat, watermelon, melon, oranges, white beans, cowpeas, chickpeas, green beans, cotton, sunflowers and corn, as well as grazing tracts for multitudes of sheep and cattle. The area is governed by the Jezreel Valley Regional Council. The Max Stern College of Emek Yizreel and the Emek Medical Center are located in the valley. In 2006, the Israeli Transportation Ministry and Jezreel Valley Regional Council announced plans to build an international airport near Megiddo but the project was shelved due to environmental objections.

Archaeological excavations
Archaeological sites in the Jezreel Valley are currently excavated and coordinated by the Jezreel Valley Regional Project.

In 2021, archaeologist from Israel Antiquities Authority (IAA) led by researchers Tzachi Lang and Kojan Haku found in the village of Et Taiyiba an engraved stone from the late 5th century from the frame of an entrance door of a church, with a Greek inscription. The inscription reads “Christ born of Mary. This work of the most God-fearing and pious bishop [Theodo]sius and the miserable Th[omas] was built from the foundation. Whoever enters should pray for them.” According to archaeologist Dr. Walid Atrash, Theodosius was one of the first Christian bishops and this church was the first evidence of the Byzantine church’s existence in the village of Et Taiyiba.

Archaeological sites 

 Abu Zurayq
 Beit She'arim (Roman-era Jewish village)
 Ein el-Jarba
 Jezreel (city)
 Tel Kedesh
 Legio
 Tel Megiddo
 Megiddo Church
 Tel Qashish
 Tel Qiri
 Tel Risim
 Tel Shadud
 Tel Shem
 Tel Shimron
 Tel Shor
 Tel Shush
 Ti'inik
 Tel Yokneam

See also 
Battle of Ain Jalut, major battle in 1260 between the Mongols and the Mamluks.
Dead Sea
Jezreel Valley Regional Council

References

External links 

 Jezreel Valley Regional Project
 
 Geography of Israel: The Jezreel Valley on the Jewish Virtual Library
 The Jezreel Valley Museum

Valleys of Israel
Regions of Israel
Hebrew Bible valleys